The Keep It Straight and Simple Party (known simply as the KISS Party) is a minor South African classical liberal political party. It was founded by Claire C. Gaisford in 1994, when the first nonracial democratic elections were held in South Africa after the end of Apartheid and white minority rule. After being dormant in the 1999 parliamentary elections, the party resurfaced in the April 14, 2004 elections.

Electoral Performance
The party has consistently placed very low in elections.

See also
 List of political parties in South Africa

References

1994 establishments in South Africa
Classical liberal parties
Liberal parties in South Africa
Political parties established in 1994
Political parties in South Africa